The Volunteer Center of North Texas (VCNT), founded in 1971, is a volunteer center in Dallas, Texas. It seeks to recruit volunteers to serve nonprofits and their clients in the North Texas area. The Volunteer Center is an affiliate of the HandsOn Network.

History 
The Volunteer Center of North Texas (VCNT) was founded in 1971 by Annette Strauss, Mitch Jericho, Jan Sanders, and Helen Boothman. When the Center first opened in 1971, it operated from an office in downtown Dallas. Several years later, thanks to the generosity of The Meadows Foundation, the Volunteer Center moved to the Wilson Historical District to an impressive, two-story building on Live Oak Street. The Volunteer Center was initially called the Dallas Voluntary Action Center and later renamed the Volunteer Center of Dallas County. The VCNT merged with the Tarrant and Collin County volunteer centers and became the Volunteer Center of North Texas.

Programs and services 
 Bank of America Student Leaders
 Community Service Restitution
 Corporate Services
 Donated Goods Program
 ExxonMobil Community Summer Jobs Program
 Hands At Work Corporate Employee Program
 HandsOn
 ServiceWorks!
 Youth Volunteer Corps (YVC) of North Texas
 VeriFYI

Mass Care Task Force 
In 2005, Hurricane Katrina brought more than 30,000 evacuees to North Texas and area nonprofits found that they were unable to meet the needs of those who migrated into the area. Launched in 2006, the Mass Care Task Force (MCTF) is a collaboration between the American Red Cross North Texas Region, the North Texas Food Bank, The Salvation Army DFW Metroplex Command, and the Volunteer Center of North Texas with the goal of preparing North Texas for disaster. The task force is currently working on funding for the relief plan and recruiting disaster volunteers.

External links 
 Volunteer Center of North Texas

Organizations based in Dallas
Volunteer organizations in the United States
Organizations established in 1971